Qipengyuania flava  is a Gram-negative, non-spore-forming, slightly halophilic and motile bacteria from the genus Qipengyuania which has been isolated from sea water from the Sea of Japan from the Hwajinpo beach in Korea.

References

Further reading

External links
Type strain of Erythrobacter flavus at BacDive -  the Bacterial Diversity Metadatabase

Sphingomonadales
Bacteria described in 2003